This is a list of Monuments of National Importance (ASI) as officially recognized by and available through the website of the Archaeological Survey of India in the Indian state Gujarat. The monument identifier is a combination of the abbreviation of the subdivision of the list (state, ASI circle) and the numbering as published on the website of the ASI. 203 Monuments of National Importance have been recognized by the ASI in Gujarat.

List of monuments of national importance 
For technical reasons the monuments in Ahmedabad are displayed in a separate list. Please see the Gujarat page for the rest of the monuments in this state.

|}

See also 
 List of Monuments of National Importance in India for other Monuments of National Importance in India
 List of State Protected Monuments in Gujarat

References 

Ahmedabad
Tourist attractions in Ahmedabad district
Lists of tourist attractions in Gujarat